Dukedom is a turn-based strategy text-based video game about land management and was created as an expanded version of Hamurabi.

Gameplay 

The player is one of several Dukes chosen by the High King to help run the Kingdom. Their Duchy is not in the best of shape, the gameplay goal is to build up its population, land holdings, and grain reserves, ultimately hoping to become powerful enough to overthrow the High King.

The player has to manage their duchy, while paying taxes and sending, on occasion, peasants to the King's service, undergoing epidemics, locusts and rival lords secretly helped by the High King; they can buy and sell land, itself divided in several categories depending on fertility, and engaging in offensive or defensive warfare, sending both subjects and mercenaries against the enemy and winning land and grain.

Development 

Dukedom was written in PL/I D by Vince Talbot in 1976 as an expanded version of Kingdom, which itself is an expanded version of Hamurabi. The game was rewritten (with extensive revision) in I.T.S. EXBASIC by Jamie E. Hanrahan. It was adapted for /GAMES/ by David C. Barber. It was re-written from I.T.S. EXBASIC to Hewlett-Packard level F BASIC then to DEC RSTS/E BASIC-PLUS.

The game was converted to Microsoft BASIC by Richard A. Kaapke. The BASIC version appeared in Creative Computing in February 1980 and was republished in Big Computer Games (1984).

A Small Basic version called Dukedom Small Basic Version exists in source code form on CodePlex.

A complete Python version is also available on GitHub.

It inspired the game Manor, which purported to be more historically accurate.

References

External links 
1984 Big Computer Games edited by David H. Ahl

Strategy video games
City-building games
1976 video games
Video games set in the Middle Ages
Video games with textual graphics
Public-domain software with source code
Video games developed in the United States
Video games with available source code